"Number One" is a song by American musician  Pharrell Williams featuring fellow American rapper Kanye West. The heavily synthesized song was written by the two and produced by the former. It was released as the third single Williams' debut studio album In My Mind (2006).

The single was released in the UK on August 21, 2006, according to Williams' official UK mailing list. The music video was directed by Hype Williams, and features models Selita Ebanks, Miranda Kerr, and Rosie Huntington-Whiteley. There are two versions: one is a color version which features many bright colors and the other is one that is in black and white.

Music video
The music video was directed by Hype Williams, and features models Selita Ebanks, Miranda Kerr, and Rosie Huntington-Whiteley. There are two versions: one is a color version which features many bright colors and the other is in black and white.

Track listing 

UK CD
 "Number One" (Featuring Kanye West) (Explicit Album Version)
 "Swagger International"
 "Raspy"
 "Number One" (Featuring Kanye West) (Video)

UK Vinyl
 "Number One" (Featuring Kanye West) (Explicit Album Version)
 "Raspy"

UK Promo CD
 "Number One" (Featuring Kanye West) (Clean Version)

Charts

References 

2006 singles
Kanye West songs
Music videos directed by Hype Williams
Pharrell Williams songs
Song recordings produced by Pharrell Williams
Songs written by Pharrell Williams
Songs written by Kanye West